16 Comae Berenices is a single star in the northern constellation of Coma Berenices. 16 Comae Berenices is the Flamsteed designation. It is a member of the Coma Star Cluster and is visible to the naked eye with an apparent visual magnitude of 4.96.

The star is 310 million years old with a projected rotational velocity of 80 km/s. It is radiating 67 times the Sun's luminosity from its photosphere at an effective temperature of 8,299 K.

References

A-type main-sequence stars
Circumstellar disks
Coma Berenices
Comae Berenices, 16
Durchmusterung objects
108382
060746
4738